Shiwar Gram Panchayat is one of the 23 Gram Panchayat in the block of Chauth ka Barwara in Sawai Madhopur.

List of villages 

1. Shiwar

2. Sitarampura

References

Gram panchayats in India